A botanical and horticultural library is a library specializing in the preservation and collection of literature and materials about plants.  The mission of many botanical and horticultural libraries is to make accessible and available to those who use it the information on this topic.

Botanical and horticultural libraries can be found in arboretums, botanical gardens, research institutions, horticultural societies, conservatories, governmental offices, colleges, and universities as part of a larger university library.

Typical users include members of various public gardens, students of the life sciences, researchers, and scholars.

Collections

The collections within these types of libraries cover such topics as flowers, grasses, trees, fungi, aquatic plants, weeds, algae, pests, and fertilizers.  The typical collection is composed of books, periodicals, and photo collections.  The types of materials depend on the types of patrons.  A public botanical garden library may contain books for children, nursery catalogs, seed catalogs, popular how-to publications, movies, and various other media resources.  At an academic library, there may be such archived materials, such as historical letters, autographs of famous botanists, plant lists, field notes, and reports of botanic expeditions.  Much of the collection in academic botanical and horticultural libraries includes work on the identification of particular plants.  Some libraries contain live specimens and preserved samples of plants, referred to as an herbarium.

Libraries may also hold highly specialized collections of certain species.  For example, The Orchid Library of Oakes Ames is devoted exclusively to orchids.  The collection is composed of more than 5,000 journals and books devoted to the classification and identification of orchid species around the world.

Patron types

Typical users include: members of various botanic gardens; students of the life sciences including botany, horticulture, agriculture, biology, herbology, turf grass management; researchers; and scholars.

See also 

 Botany

External links of notable examples

Botany and Horticulture Library at Library of Congress
San Francisco Botanic Garden
Harvard University Herbaria
New York Botanical Garden Mertz Library
National Tropical Botanical Garden
Massachusetts Horticultural Society Library
The Lenhardt Library of the Chicago Botanic Garden
Arnold Arboretum Library 
The Huntington Library, Art Collections and Botanical Gardens
Elisabeth C. Miller University of Washington Botanic Gardens
Eleanor Squire Library, Cleveland Botanical Garden
Helen Fowler Library of the Denver Botanic Gardens

Other external links
The Council on Botanical and Horticultural Libraries, Inc.
European Botanical and Horticultural Libraries Group

References 

Libraries by subject